Lorraine Mary Moller  (born 1 June 1955) is a former athlete from New Zealand, who competed in track athletics and later specialised in the marathon. Moller's international career lasted over 20 years and included winning a silver medal in the marathon at the 1986 Commonwealth Games in Edinburgh and a bronze medal in the marathon at the 1992 Olympic Games in Barcelona at the age of 37. A four-time Olympian, she also completed the marathon at the 1984, 1988 and 1996 games. Her other marathon victories included the 1984 Boston Marathon and being a three-time winner (1986,87,89) of the Osaka International Ladies Marathon.

Moller was married to fellow Olympian Ron Daws and coached by John Davies.

Track career
Moller's first international competition was the 1974 British Commonwealth Games at Christchurch, where she finished fifth in the 800 m. Her time of 2:03.63 was her lifetime best and is still the fastest ever by a New Zealand junior (under 20) woman.

Although Moller ran her first marathon in 1979, there were no sanctioned marathons for females at an international athletics competition until 1984. Moller was instead selected for both the 1500 m and 3000 m at the 1982 Commonwealth Games in Brisbane, winning bronze medals for both events.

In 1985 Moller broke the New Zealand 1500 m record, running 4:10.35 at Brussels. In 1986 at the Commonwealth Games, as well as the marathon (see below), she competed in the 3000 m, finishing fifth.

In the 1993 New Year Honours, Moller was appointed a Member of the Order of the British Empire, for services to athletics.

, Moller ranked in the all-time top ten in New Zealand for the 1500 m, mile, 3000 m and 5000 m. She also ranked 11th for the 10,000 m.

Personal Bests:

Marathon career
Moller ran her first marathon on 23 June 1979, winning Grandma's Marathon in Duluth, Minnesota in 2:37:37. The time was the fastest ever by a New Zealander and the sixth-fastest ever run by a woman. She then won her next 7 marathons.

She was a triple winner of the Osaka Ladies Marathon, and in 1984 won the Boston Marathon.

All of Moller's appearances at the Olympic Games were in the marathon. Her full records are:
1984: 5th (2:28:34)
1988: 33rd (2:37:52)
1992: 3rd (2:33:59)
1996: 46th (2:42:21)

She also won the silver medal at the 1986 Commonwealth Games in Edinburgh, running 2:28:17, her lifetime best.

In 2012 she was inducted into the Boulder (Colorado) Sports Hall of Fame.  She has worked with the Lydiard Foundation and the Master Plan training system to share the lessons of running coach Arthur Lydiard.

Achievements

Author 
 Moller, Lorraine. On the Wings of Mercury: The Lorraine Moller Story. 2007. Longacre Press. .

Audio Interviews 
TheFinalSprint.com's Podcast Interview: "LORRAINE MOLLER: Female running pioneer and Lydiard protégé: "Part 1" and "Part 2"
Interview at flotrack

References 

1955 births
Living people
New Zealand female long-distance runners
Olympic bronze medalists for New Zealand
Athletes (track and field) at the 1984 Summer Olympics
Athletes (track and field) at the 1988 Summer Olympics
Athletes (track and field) at the 1992 Summer Olympics
Athletes (track and field) at the 1996 Summer Olympics
Olympic athletes of New Zealand
Athletes (track and field) at the 1974 British Commonwealth Games
Athletes (track and field) at the 1982 Commonwealth Games
Athletes (track and field) at the 1986 Commonwealth Games
Commonwealth Games silver medallists for New Zealand
Commonwealth Games bronze medallists for New Zealand
Boston Marathon female winners
Paris Marathon female winners
Commonwealth Games medallists in athletics
New Zealand Members of the Order of the British Empire
People from Putāruru
Medalists at the 1992 Summer Olympics
Olympic bronze medalists in athletics (track and field)
World Athletics Championships athletes for New Zealand
Sportspeople from Waikato
Medallists at the 1982 Commonwealth Games
Medallists at the 1986 Commonwealth Games